Die Bajadere is the name of two musical works:

 "Die Bajadere" (polka) by Johann Strauss II (1871)
 Die Bajadere (operetta) by Emmerich Kálmán (1921)

See also
 La Bayadère (ballet) by Marius Petipa (1877)